Full City is a Panama-flagged bulk carrier made infamous by running aground after an engine failure during a storm at the island of Saastein (Såstein) outside Langesund, Telemark, Norway, spilling 700 tons of heavy bunker fuel oil in a sensitive wildlife refuge area on 31 July 2009. Full City was built by Hakodate Dockyard Co. Ltd. in Hakodate, Hokkaidō, Japan in 1995.
The vessel was pulled off the rocks and first towed to Stathelle, and later to Gothenburg
for full drydock repairs.

On 5 May 2011, as part of NATO's counter-piracy Operation Ocean Shield, the carrier USS Carl Vinson, the cruiser USS Bunker Hill, and  the Turkish frigate Giresun responded to a distress call from Full City.  An Indian Navy Tu-142 maritime patrol aircraft located Full City, and while Giresun boarded the merchant vessel, Bunker Hill intercepted a dhow believed to be the 'mothership' for the pirate attack.  Bunker Hills VBSS boarding party seized weapons and other equipment commonly used in piracy, and the boarding party also sank a small skiff being towed by the dhow.  Giresuns boarding party found Full Citys Chinese crew safe and in control of their ship.

See also
 List of oil spills
 Full City oil spill

References

External links
 Full City position tracker at Sailwx
 Full City Daily Vessel itinerarie at MarineTraffic.com

1994 ships
Bulk carriers
Maritime incidents in 2009
Ships built in Japan
Ships of COSCO Shipping